Giuseppe Salerno, more commonly called il Zoppo di Gangi (Cripple from the town of Gangi) (1588-1630) was an Italian painter active in his native Sicily in a Mannerist style. He may have used the title of Zoppo because he was a pupil of Gaspare Vazzano or Bazzano (1562 - 1630), who also was known as the Zoppo di Gangi. Among his known works are:
Madonna delle Grazie with Saints Mark and Blaise (1611): Chiesa di San Marco e Biagio, Petralia Sottana
Holy Family with Saint Anne and Joachim (1607): San Francesco d'Assisi, Petralia Sottana
St Francis receives stigmata (1624): San Francesco d'Assisi, Petralia Sottana
Triumph of the Eucharist with Saints Catherine and Peter Martyr (1617): Chiesa Madre, Petralia Sottana
Triumph of the Eucharist with Saints Catherine and Peter Martyr (1607): Chiesa Madre, Petralia Sottana
Five Wounds of Christ (1629): Chiesa Madre, Petralia Sottana
St Maurus Abbot (1623): Chiesa Madre, Petralia Sottana
St Onophrius: Chiesa Madre, Petralia Sottana
Dormition of the Virgin (1607): Once in the Franciscan convent, now housed in Palazzo del Giglio (Town Hall) of Petralia Sottana
Altarpiece in Santa Chiara, Enna
Life of St Franci (attributed to Zoppo di Gangi): Francesco d'Assisi, Gela
Saint Jerome: Sant'Orsola, Palermo

References

17th-century Italian painters
Italian male painters
Italian Mannerist painters
1588 births
1630 deaths
Painters from Sicily